The Puerto Rico Wing of the Civil Air Patrol (CAP) –– is the highest echelon of Civil Air Patrol in the territories of Puerto Rico and the U.S. Virgin Islands. Puerto Rico Wing headquarters are located in San Juan, Puerto Rico. The Puerto Rico Wing consists of over 700 cadet and adult members at 28 locations across the island. Puerto Rico Wing was activated on November 22, 1949.

Mission
The Puerto Rico Wing performs the three primary missions of the Civil Air Patrol: providing emergency services; offering cadet programs for youth; and providing aerospace education for Civil Air Patrol members and the general public.

Emergency services
The Civil Air Patrol performs emergency services, which includes performing air and ground search and rescue, disaster relief, counter-drug operations, homeland security missions, and assisting in humanitarian aid assignments. The Civil Air Patrol provides the Air Force support through conducting light transport, communications support, and low-altitude route surveys. CAP members can qualify in different operational qualifications to participate in emergency services missions.

Cadet programs
The Civil Air Patrol offers a cadet program for youth aged 12 to 20, which includes aerospace education, leadership training, physical fitness and moral leadership. CAP cadets wear modified versions of United States Air Force uniforms, hold rank and grade, and practice military customs and courtesies.

Aerospace education
The Civil Air Patrol offers aerospace education for CAP members and the general public, including providing training for its members, and offering workshops for youth throughout the nation through schools and public aviation events.

Organization

Notable alumni
Elmer Román - former Puerto Rico Secretary of State
Eurípides Rubio - recipient of the Medal of Honor
Clara Livingston - former PR wing commander and 200th woman to earn a pilot license

See also
Awards and decorations of the Civil Air Patrol
Ranks of the Civil Air Patrol
Puerto Rico Air National Guard
Puerto Rico State Guard
1st Air Base Group

References

External links
Puerto Rico Wing Civil Air Patrol official website
Puerto Rico Wing Report 2021

Wings of the Civil Air Patrol
Education in Puerto Rico
Military in Puerto Rico